Nuno Filipe da Silva (born 14 March 1994) is a Swiss professional football player who plays for FC Aarau in the Swiss Challenge League.

Football career
A youth product of Young Boys, he made his professional debut for his former youth club Breitenrain in the Swiss Promotion League, the third tier of Swiss football.

On 23 July 2017, da Silva made his top-flight debut with Thun in the Swiss Super League, in a match against Sion. In 2020, he was relegated together with Thun to the Swiss Challenge League, after losing the relegation play-off to FC Vaduz.

He caused quite a stir in February 2021, when he signed for Swiss record champion Grasshopper Club Zürich. GC had been relegated to the Challenge League the previous season and were in direct competition with Thun for the top spot at the time. Together with GC, he achieved promotion to the Swiss Super League at the end of the season.

After one and a half years at Grasshopper Club Zürich, he returned to the Challenge League, signing with FC Aarau on 16 June 2022. He had previously played at Aarau in 2016 during a loan spell.

References

External links

1994 births
Footballers from Zürich
Swiss people of Portuguese descent
Living people
Swiss men's footballers
Association football forwards
Breitenrain Bern players
FC Aarau players
FC Thun players
FC Winterthur players
Swiss Super League players
Swiss Challenge League players
Swiss Promotion League players
Swiss 1. Liga (football) players